The 2016–17 Czech National Football League was the 24th season of the Czech Republic's second tier football league.

Team changes

After one season played with 15 teams, the number of teams in the Czech National Football League increased back to 16 for the 2016–17 season.

From FNL

 FC Hradec Králové (promoted to 2016–17 Czech First League)
 Karviná (promoted to 2016–17 Czech First League)
 Olomouc B (relegated to 2016–17 Moravian–Silesian Football League)
 FK Slavoj Vyšehrad (relegated to 2016–17 Bohemian Football League)

To FNL

 SK Sigma Olomouc (relegated from 2015–16 Czech First League)
 FC Baník Ostrava (relegated from 2015–16 Czech First League)
 FK Viktoria Žižkov (promoted from 2015–16 Bohemian Football League)
 1. SK Prostějov (promoted from 2015–16 Moravian-Silesian Football League)
 MFK Vítkovice (promoted from 2015–16 Moravian-Silesian Football League)

Team overview

League table

See also
 2016–17 Czech First League
 2016–17 Czech Cup

References

2016–17 in Czech football
Czech National Football League seasons
Czech Republic